Pickering Farm is a former farm located in Issaquah, Washington listed on the National Register of Historic Places. It has been the site for a farmer's market since the late 1990s. Pickering Barn is available for rental.

See also
 National Register of Historic Places listings in King County, Washington

References

1890 establishments in Washington (state)
Buildings and structures completed in 1890
Farms on the National Register of Historic Places in Washington (state)
National Register of Historic Places in King County, Washington
Parks in Issaquah, Washington